The 2004 Queensland Cup season was the 9th season of Queensland's top-level statewide rugby league competition run by the Queensland Rugby League. The competition featured 12 teams playing a 26-week long season (including finals) from March to September.

The Burleigh Bears defeated the Easts Tigers 22–18 in the Grand Final at Suncorp Stadium to claim their second premiership. Burleigh  Brent McConnell was named the competition's Player of the Year, winning the Courier Mail Medal.

Teams 
Wests Panthers, who participated in the Queensland Cup since the inaugural season in 1996, withdrew from the competition at the end of 2003. They were replaced by Brothers-Valleys, a club formed in 2002 by the merger of Past Brothers, who played in the Queensland Cup from 1996 to 1998, and the Fortitude Valley Diehards, who originally folded in 1995.

The Brisbane Broncos, Melbourne Storm and North Queensland Cowboys were again affiliated with the Toowoomba Clydesdales, Norths Devils and North Queensland Young Guns respectively.

Ladder

Finals series 

† Match decided in extra time.

Grand Final 

Burleigh, who finished as minor premiers for the second season in a row, defeated Easts by a point in their major semi final to earn a spot in the Grand Final, their third since 1997. Easts, who came 3rd in the regular season, defeated the 2nd placed Norths in the qualifying final to set up their match with Burleigh. The loss saw them then face Wynnum in the preliminary final, who they defeated 50–24 to set up a rematch with the Bears in the Grand Final. During the regular season, Burleigh defeated Easts in both of their encounters (46–20 in Round 5 and 36–34 in Round 15).

First half 
Burleigh opened the first half strongly when five-eighth Adam Hayden stepped through Easts' defensive line to score in the 6th minute. Three minutes later, Hayden put centre Nick Shaw through a hole to score the Bears' second try. The Tigers got back into the contest in the 20th minute, when hooker Trent Young muscled his way over underneath posts. Burleigh regained their 10-point lead when second rower John Flint burst through to score in the 31st minute as the Bears took a 16–6 lead into the break.

Second half 
Easts hit back 10 minutes into the second half when former Australian and Queensland representative Steve Renouf spun through a defender to score in the corner. Micheal Pearce converted the try from the sideline to cut the lead to four. A Reggie Cressbrook penalty goal pushed Burleigh's lead to six, setting up a tense final 20 minutes. With just over a minute to play, Burleigh's Kris Flint attempted a field goal that would've sealed the game for the Bears but missed to the right, giving Easts one last chance. With 30 seconds remaining, Tigers' halfback Dane Campbell put in a chip kick for winger Steve Beattie, who burst through two Burleigh defenders to score. Campbell then converted from out wide to send the game into extra time.

Extra time 
Easts had the first opportunity to win the game in the third minute of extra time, when Campbell attempted a field goal then went wide right. Both teams missed multiple field goal attempts before Burleigh prop Shane O'Flanagan barged over to score the premiership-winning try in the 17th minute of extra time.

Player statistics

Leading try scorers

Leading point scorers

End-of-season awards 
 Courier Mail Medal: Brent McConnell ( Burleigh Bears)
 Rookie of the Year: Luke Dalziel-Don ( Wynnum Seagulls)

See also 

 Queensland Cup
 Queensland Rugby League

References 

2004 in Australian rugby league
Queensland Cup